"Album of the Year (Freestyle)" is a song by American rapper J. Cole. It was released on August 7, 2018 through Dreamville Records, Roc Nation, and Interscope Records.

Background
On August 7, 2018, Cole released "Album of the Year (Freestyle)" over the instrumental to Nas' and the Bravehearts' 2001 single, "Oochie Wally". The single was accompanied by a music video, which premiered on WorldStarHipHop. Cole also announced a new project titled, The Off Season, which Cole planned to release ahead of his next studio album, The Fall Off. The video's description reads: The Off Season coming soon... All roads lead to The Fall Off - Cole".

Music video
The song's accompanying music video was released on August 7, 2018 as a WorldStarHipHop exclusive. The video was directed by Simon David, and was filmed in Raleigh, North Carolina.

Charts

References 

2018 songs
J. Cole songs
Songs written by J. Cole
2018 singles
Songs written by Nas